The Union of Nova Scotia Mi'kmaq is a Tribal Council in Nova Scotia, Canada. It was created in 1969, and known as the Union of Nova Scotia Indians until being renamed in 2019. Since Acadia First Nation left to join the Confederacy of Mainland Mi'kmaq in 2019, the UNSM has five member communities: Eskasoni, Membertou, Potlotek, Wagmatcook, and We'koqma'q.

See also
 Confederacy of Mainland Mi'kmaq - another Tribal Council in Nova Scotia

References

External links 

 Official website

First Nations tribal councils
Indigenous organizations in Nova Scotia
Mi'kmaq in Canada